Haruna Kasolo Kyeyune is a Ugandan politician. He is the State Minister for Microfinance in the Ugandan Cabinet. He was appointed to that position on 6 June 2016. He concurrently served as the elected parliamentary representative for Kyotera County, Rakai District, in the 10th Ugandan Parliament (2016–2021). He was succeeded  in parliament by John Paul Mpalanyi Lukwago, a member of the Democratic Party(DP) after the 2021 Uganda general elections.

See also
 Cabinet of Uganda
 Parliament of Uganda

References

Living people
Rakai District
Members of the Parliament of Uganda
Government ministers of Uganda
People from Rakai District
People from Central Region, Uganda
Year of birth missing (living people)
21st-century Ugandan politicians